The Dutchman's Cap is a hill with a 24.4 m high bluff, which is in Lithuania's Seaside Regional Park, near Karklė and 2 km north of Giruliai on the Baltic Sea coast. It was created 12000–15000 years ago during the last Baltic glaciation.

The name stems from an alleged similarity of the high bank to a mariner's cap.

The hill is a parabolic dune created by aeolian processes on a moraine ridge. The location is now subject to strong erosion by the Baltic Sea, which is exposing various-sized boulders from the moraine. As a consequence, boulder rubble has accumulated on the so-called beach. As the bluff's base is destroyed, earth slips down the bluff's entire face, in an example of mass wasting.

The Dutchman's Cap has long been a navigational guide for sailors and fishermen, and so in the early 19th century, markers were erected here, and have been shown on charts ever since. A view of the sea with a steep shoreline and stony beaches opens up here. The top of the bluff is a good place to watch birds flying above the sea.

References

Cliffs of Lithuania
Hills of Lithuania